Ove Frederiksen (22 August 1884 – 24 May 1966) was a Danish tennis player. He competed in two events at the 1912 Summer Olympics.

References

External links
 

1884 births
1966 deaths
Danish male tennis players
Olympic tennis players of Denmark
Tennis players at the 1912 Summer Olympics
People from Køge Municipality
Sportspeople from Region Zealand